List of events in 2014 in esports (also known as professional gaming).

Calendar of events

(for extended events the final date is listed)
 

 
Esports by year